This is a list of Southern Illinois Salukis football players in the NFL Draft.

Key

Selections

References

Southern Illinois

Southern Illinois Salukis NFL Draft